The People's Peace Front was a political party in Burma.

History
The party was established by former Anti-Fascist People's Freedom League member U Aung Than, the older brother of former AFPFL leader Aung San, in order to contest the 1951–52 elections. Its leadership also included U Do, the brother of Prime Minister U Nu. The party failed to win a seat in the elections.

Prior to the 1956 elections it joined the National United Front alliance, which went on to win 48 of the 250 seats in the Chamber of Deputies.

References

Defunct political parties in Myanmar
Socialist parties in Myanmar